The NHL on Fox is the branding used for broadcasts of National Hockey League (NHL) games that were produced by Fox Sports and televised on the Fox network from the 1994–1995 NHL season until the 1998–1999 NHL season. NHL games continued to air on the Fox Sports Networks in the form of regional game telecasts until the 2021 rebrand to Bally Sports.

History
On the heels of its surprise acquisition of the television rights to the National Football League in December 1993, Fox sought deals with other major sports leagues to expand its newly created sports division, opting to go after the rights to broadcast National Hockey League (NHL) games. CBS, which had just lost its NFL package (which primarily included the rights to regular season and playoff games from the National Football Conference) to Fox and had also lost its Major League Baseball and college football rights to other networks, was Fox's primary competitor for the NHL package, hoping to replace some of the sports programming it had lost to the upstart network.

Nevertheless, in a serious blow to the elder network, Fox outbid CBS for the NHL package as well. On September 9, 1994, the National Hockey League reached a five-year contract with Fox for the broadcast television rights to the league's games, beginning with the 1994–95 season. The network paid $155 million ($31 million annually) to televise NHL regular season and postseason games, considerably less than the $1.58 billion Fox paid for the NFL television rights.

The NHL's initial deal with Fox was significant, as a U.S. network television contract was long thought unattainable for the league during the presidency of John Ziegler. For 17 years after the 1975 Finals were broadcast on NBC, there would be no national over-the-air network coverage of the NHL in the United States (except for the 1979 Challenge Cup and Game 6 of the 1980 Stanley Cup Finals on CBS, and NBC's coverage of the NHL All-Star Game from 1990 to 1994) and only spotty coverage on regional networks. This was due to the fact that no network was willing to commit to carrying a large number of games, in turn providing low ratings for NHL telecasts. ABC would eventually resume the network broadcasting of regular NHL games (on a time buy basis through ESPN) for the 1992–93 season. This continued through the 1993–94 season, before Fox took over for the next five seasons.

Fox inaugurated its NHL coverage on April 2, 1995, toward the end of the 1994–95 regular season, with six games (between the New York Rangers and Philadelphia Flyers; St. Louis Blues and Detroit Red Wings; Boston Bruins and Washington Capitals; Chicago Blackhawks and Dallas Stars; Florida Panthers and Tampa Bay Lightning; and the San Jose Sharks and Anaheim Ducks). Mike Emrick and John Davidson were the lead broadcast team, and Joe Micheletti served as the reporter for national game broadcasts on Fox, while regionally-distributed games were handled by a variety of announcers, in addition to Emrick, Davidson, and Micheletti. For the first four years of the deal, James Brown hosted the show and Dave Maloney was the studio analyst from the Fox Network Center studios in Los Angeles. For the fifth and final season, Suzy Kolber served as the studio host and Terry Crisp served as the studio analyst. Occasionally, active NHL players such as Mike Modano would serve as guest analysts.

FoxTrax
Fox's NHL broadcasts are perhaps best remembered for its use of FoxTrax (colloquially called the "glow puck," "smart puck," or "super puck"), a specialized ice hockey puck designed for the network's NHL telecasts which featured internal electronics that allowed its position to be tracked. It was primarily used to visually highlight the puck on-screen and display a trail when the puck was moving rapidly. The FoxTrax puck, while considered to be generally popular according to Fox Sports, generated a great deal of controversy and criticism, especially in Canada, from longtime fans of the game, and was ridiculed by comedians on both sides of the border.

Stanley Cup playoff coverage
During the first two rounds of the playoffs, at least two games were aired each round and were distributed regionally, unless other series involving other scheduled games were already finished, in which case the telecast was broadcast nationally. Canadian viewers were upset over the apparent preference that the NHL had for Fox ahead of CBC Television in regards to the scheduling of playoff games; Montreal Gazette sports journalist Pat Hickey wrote that the schedule was "just another example of how the N.H.L. snubs its nose at the country that invented hockey and its fans."

All-Star Game, Conference Finals and Stanley Cup Finals
For the All-Star Game, Conference Finals, and Stanley Cup Finals, the games (which were national telecasts) were hosted from the arena. The 1996 and 1997 All-Star Games were televised in prime time.

Stanley Cup Finals
Fox split coverage of the Stanley Cup Finals with ESPN. Game 1 of the 1995 Stanley Cup Finals was the first Finals game shown on network television since 1980 and the first in prime time since 1973. Games 1, 5, and 7 were usually scheduled to be televised by Fox; and Games 2, 3, 4, and 6 were set to air on ESPN. However, from 1995 to 1998, the Finals matches were all four game sweeps; the 1999 Finals ended in six games. The consequence was that – except for 1995, when Fox did televise Game 4 – the decisive game was never shown on network television. Perhaps in recognition of this, Games 3–7 were always televised by ABC in the succeeding broadcast agreement between the NHL and ABC Sports/ESPN.

Game 4 of the 1995 Final was notable because not only did the New Jersey Devils win the Stanley Cup, but also the team's main television play-by-play announcer, Mike Emrick, announced it.

KTVU, the Fox affiliate in the San Francisco Bay Area, dropped Game 4 of the 1995 Stanley Cup Finals (June 24) for a San Francisco Giants game. The game between the Giants and Florida Marlins in Miami had a long rain-delay. This allowed for KTVU to broadcast the hockey game after-all. However, the baseball game finally started before the hockey game ended. KTVU got a lot of complaints, so they re-aired the end of the hockey game the following Saturday.

Stanley Cup Finals broadcast schedules
1995 – Games 1, 4, 5, 7 on Fox; Games 2, 3, 6 on ESPN
1996 – Games 1, 3, 5, 7 on Fox; Games 2, 4, 6 on ESPN
1997 – Games 1, 5, 6, 7 on Fox; Games 2, 3, 4 on ESPN
1998 – Games 1, 5, 7 on Fox; Games 2, 3, 4, 6 on ESPN
1999 – Games 1, 2, 5, 7 on Fox; Games 3, 4, 6 on ESPN

The end of NHL on Fox
Things ended badly between Fox and the league in 1999, when the NHL announced a new television deal with ESPN that also called for sister broadcast network ABC to become the new network television partner (as previously mentioned). Fox challenged that it had not been given a chance to match the network component of the deal, but ABC ultimately prevailed.

Fox placed a bid for NHL broadcast rights when they came up for renewal in 2011 but dropped out of the running as a result of a bidding war between NBCUniversal and ESPN. The bid made by NBCUniversal (which owns NBC, Versus and USA Network and, through its ownership of the Philadelphia Flyers, a stake in the league itself) was selected by the league, in a ten-year extension of its existing broadcast contract.

After Disney acquired the entertainment unit 21st Century Fox (excluding the main network and sports units) in 2019, it resold the regional Fox Sports Networks to Sinclair Broadcast Group, which maintained the rights on some NHL teams. In 2021, Sinclair rebranded the channels as Bally Sports.

In August 2019, Fox Sports SVP/sales Mark Evans told The Big Lead that Fox would be interested in pursuing NHL media rights when they became available.

In April 2021, Fox Sports was reportedly considered a front runner to acquire the NHL's "B" package after ABC/ESPN acquired the "A" package from NBC; the rights would ultimately go to Turner Sports.

Coverage overview

Regular season

Fox televised between 5 and 11 regionally distributed games on Saturday or Sunday afternoons during the regular season, where anywhere from 2 to 6 games ran concurrently. All times below are Eastern.

1994–95

1995–96

Note:
*Denotes use of FoxTrax puck.

1996–97

1997–98

Fox was initially scheduled to air a Pittsburgh Penguins-Tampa Bay Lightning game on April 4.

1998–99

Notes
^The Pittsburgh Penguins-New York Rangers game on April 18 (Wayne Gretzky's final game before his retirement) began on MSG Network in the New York City market as WNYW (Fox's flagship station) aired a Yankees game against the Detroit Tigers. The station joined the hockey game midway through the second period. The week prior (April 11), WNYW aired another Yankees game over the Pittsburgh-Detroit NHL game, which instead aired on MSG from start to finish.

Stanley Cup playoff coverage

1995

Notes
The May 14 game in Colisée Pepsi was the final home game ever for the Quebec Nordiques. The team became the Colorado Avalanche in the fall of 1995.
The June 24 game in New Jersey was the Stanley Cup Finals' deciding game as the Devils swept the Red Wings. Although Fox did retain rights to certain other games where the Cup could be decided (including any and all seventh games), 1995 was the only time during its run as NHL broadcaster that Fox actually carried the Cup-clinching victory on-air.

1996

*Denotes use of FoxTrax puck.

Note
The April 28 game in Winnipeg was the final home game for the original Winnipeg Jets. The franchise became the Phoenix Coyotes in the fall of 1996.

1997

1998

1999

Personalities

Play-by-play
 Kenny Albert
 Mike Emrick
 Pat Foley
 Randy Hahn
 Rick Jeanneret
 John Kelly
 Mike Lange
 Josh Lewin
 Jiggs McDonald
 Bob Miller
 Howie Rose
 Sam Rosen
 Dick Stockton
 Dave Strader

Color commentators
 Terry Crisp
 John Davidson
 Mike Eruzione
 Jim Fox
 Gary Green 
 Brian Hayward
 Joe Micheletti
 Peter McNab
 Greg Millen
 Denis Potvin
 Daryl Reaugh
 Mickey Redmond
 Chico Resch
 Pete Stemkowski
 Craig Simpson
 Paul Steigerwald

Studio commentators
 James Brown – studio host (1994–1998)
 Terry Crisp – color commentary/studio analyst (1998–1999)
 Suzy Kolber – studio host (1998–1999)
 Dave Maloney – studio analyst (1994–1998)

Reporters
 Joe Micheletti
 Sandra Neil
 Craig Simpson

Ratings

Stanley Cup Finals

Game 4 of the 1995 Stanley Cup Finals drew a 4.7 rating and a 10 share. In the New York City market (on Fox owned-and-operated station WNYW), the game drew a 10.6 rating and 21 share; in Detroit (on Fox affiliate, now owned-and-operated station, WJBK), it drew a 14.1 rating and 26 share.

Regular season

All-Star Game

NHL coverage on other Fox-owned outlets

Fox owned-and-operated television stations

Fox Sports Networks owned-and-operated affiliates

Former regional rightsholders

References

Notes

External links

TV Theme - FOX, Hockey Theme.wav
Puck The Media - Great Moments from The NHL on FOX
Videos of the Week - NHL on Fox
The Suitor Tutor, Part 3: All The Rest
Sports Media Watch: How Disney outfoxed the NHL.
Glow Pucks, Fox Trax and Robots. The American Hockey Fan's Fascination with NHL on FOX Part 1

Fox Sports original programming
Fox
1995 American television series debuts
1999 American television series endings
1990s American television series